The Macau Fisherman's Wharf is an integrated waterfront, hotel, convention, dining, retail and entertainment complex in Sé, Macau, China.

History
The construction of the theme park took 5 years, before an opening ceremony by the Chief Executive of Macau and trial operation began on December 31, 2005. After one year of trial operation, the wharf was officially opened on December 31, 2006.

Architecture
The theme park gets 40% of its area from reclamation from the sea.

Visitor attractions
East meets west attractions include:

Rocks Hotel, modeled on the elaborate charms of 18th century Victoriana, providing 72 guestrooms and suites.

Harbourview Hotel, based on 18th century Prague design, provides 389 comfortable guest rooms and 55 spacious suites.

Roman Amphitheatre, an outdoor Colosseum equipped with 2,000 seats, designed as a venue for concerts and other performances .

Convention and Exhibition Centre, one of the largest venues for meetings and banquets in the city centre .

Legend Boulevard, a complex of retail, hotels, dining and a casino themed on coastal towns including Miami, Cape Town, New Orleans, Amsterdam, Spain, Lisbon, Rome and English, the Palace and the Italian Riviera. There are different cuisines from all over the world such as Jade Orchid, Vic's, Praha Restaurant, etc. 

Babylon Casino, features VIP room and mass gaming floor, and near the slots casino which is connected by a skybridge in Harbourview Hotel.

See also
List of Macao-related topics
Fisherman's Wharves in other places

References

2006 establishments in Macau
Amusement parks in Macau
Sé, Macau
2012 mergers and acquisitions